Artuk can refer to:

 Artuk Bey
 Artuk Bey (fictional character)
 Artuk, Çermik